This is a list of places in India which have standing links to local communities in other countries known as "town twinning" (usually in Europe) or "sister cities" (usually in the rest of the world).

A
Agra

 Petra, Jordan
 Tempe, United States

Ahmedabad

 Columbus, United States
 Guangzhou, China
 Jersey City, United States

Amritsar

 Bakersfield, United States
 Sandwell, England, United Kingdom
 Thetford, England, United Kingdom

Anandpur Sahib
 Vernon, Canada

Aurangabad

 Dunhuang, China
 Ingolstadt, Germany

Auroville
 Campinas, Brazil

Ayodhya

 Gimhae, South Korea
 Janakpur, Nepal

B
Bangalore

 Chengdu, China
 Cleveland, United States
 Minsk, Belarus
 San Francisco, United States

Bhubaneswar

 Bloemfontein, South Africa
 Cupertino, United States

Bikaner
 Kütahya, Turkey

Bodh Gaya
 Nara Prefecture, Japan

C
Chennai

 Chongqing, China
 Denver, United States
 Kuala Lumpur, Malaysia
 San Antonio, United States

 Volgograd, Russia

Coimbatore

 Esslingen am Neckar, Germany
 Toledo, United States

D
Daman
 Coimbra, Portugal

Delhi

 Beijing, China
 Chicago, United States

Diu
 Loures, Portugal

H
Hyderabad

 Brisbane, Australia
 Indianapolis, United States
 Ipswich, Australia
 Montgomery County, United States
 Qingdao, China
 Riverside, United States
 Uberaba, Brazil

J
Jaipur

 Calgary, Canada
 Fremont, United States

Jalandhar

 Gravesham, England, United Kingdom
 Hounslow, England, United Kingdom
 Union City, United States

Jamshedpur
 Gunsan, South Korea

K
Kochi

 Menlo Park, United States
 Norfolk, United States
 Pyatigorsk, Russia

Kolkata

 Dallas, United States
 Dhaka, Bangladesh
 Incheon, South Korea
 Jersey City, United States
 Kunming, China

 Odesa, Ukraine
 Thessaloniki, Greece

Kotturu
 Shepshed, England, United Kingdom

L
Lucknow

 Montreal, Canada
 Wenzhou, China

M
Mangalore

 Delta, Canada
 Hamilton, Canada

Manipal
 Loma Linda, United States

Meerut
 Zhukovsky, Russia

Mumbai

 Busan, South Korea
 Galați, Romania
 Honolulu, United States
 İzmir, Turkey
 Los Angeles, United States
 Saint Petersburg, Russia
 Shanghai, China
 Stuttgart, Germany
 Yokohama, Japan

Mysore

 Cincinnati, United States
 Nashua, United States

N
Nagpur
 Jinan, China

New Delhi

 Jersey City, United States
 Moscow, Russia
 Samarkand, Uzbekistan

O
Ongole
 Uberaba, Brazil

P
Panaji

 Victoria, Seychelles

Pimpri-Chinchwad
 Gunsan, South Korea

Pondicherry
 Basse-Terre, Guadeloupe, France

Pune

 Austin, United States
 Columbus, United States
 Fairbanks, United States
 San Jose, United States
 Vacoas-Phoenix, Mauritius
 Okayama, Japan

R
Rajkot
 Leicester, England, United Kingdom

S
Shimla
 Carbondale, United States

T
Thrissur
 Yessentuki, Russia

V
Vadodara

 Ashkelon, Israel
 Greenville, United States

Varanasi
 Kathmandu, Nepal

Vijayawada
 Modesto, United States

References

India
Lists of cities in India
Foreign relations of India
India geography-related lists